The Hoysala Empire was a Kannadiga power originating from the Indian subcontinent that ruled most of what is now Karnataka between the 10th and the 14th centuries. The capital of the Hoysalas was initially located at Belur, but was later moved to Halebidu.

The Hoysala rulers were originally from Malenadu, an elevated region in the Western Ghats. In the 12th century, taking advantage of the internecine warfare between the Western Chalukya Empire and Kalachuris of Kalyani, the Hoysalas annexed areas of present-day Karnataka and the fertile areas north of the Kaveri delta in present-day Tamil Nadu. By the 13th century, they governed most of Karnataka, entire northwestern parts of Tamil Nadu and parts of western Andhra Pradesh and Telangana in the Deccan Plateau.

The Hoysala era was an important period in the development of South Indian art, architecture, and religion. The empire is remembered today primarily for Hoysala architecture; 100 surviving temples are scattered across Karnataka.

Well-known temples which exhibit what the historian Sailendra Sen has called "an amazing display of sculptural exuberance" include the Chennakeshava Temple in Belur, the Hoysaleswara Temple in Halebidu, and the Chennakesava Temple in Somanathapura. The Hoysala rulers also patronised the fine arts, encouraging literature to flourish in Kannada and Sanskrit.

History

Legendary beginnings

Kannada folklore tells a legend of a young man, Sala (also known as Poysala), who saved his Jain guru Sudatta by killing a tiger (sometimes described as a lion) that they encountered whilst in a forest, near the temple of the goddess Vasantika at Angadi, now called Sosevuru. The word strike translates to "hoy" in Old Kannada, hence the name 'Hoy-sala'. The legend purporting to show how Sala became the founder of the Hoysala dynasty is shown in the Belur inscription of the Hoysala king Vishnuvardhana, dated , but owing to several inconsistencies in the story it remains in the realm of folklore. Vishnuvardhana achieved a victory over the Cholas at Talakadu in 1116, and the legend may have arisen or gained popularity after this event, as the Hoysala emblem depicts Sala fighting a tiger, the tiger being the emblem of the Cholas.

Establishment of the kingdom
The Hoysalas originated from the Western Ghats, mountains north-west of Gangavadi in Mysore. They emerged as borderland chiefs during the conflict between the Western Chalukya Empire and the Cholas, gaining power as they sided with the Chalukyas and were made provincial governors. After the authority of the Chalukyas declined, the Hoysalas managed to gain their independence. Under Vishnuvardhana, the Hoysalas achieved the status of a real kingdom. He annexed Gangavadi and parts of Nolambavadi from the Cholas in 1116 and moved the capital from Belur to Dorasamudra (modern Halebidu),  After taking Talakadu and Kolar in 1116, Vishnuvardhana assumed the title Talakadugonda in memory of his victory. Historians refer to the founders of the Hoysala dynasty as Maleparolganda ('Lord of the hills'), basing their evidence on inscriptions that describes them as being originally from Malenadu.

The earliest record of a member of the Hoysala dynasty is dated 950 and names Arekalla as the chieftain. Arekalla was succeeded in turn by Maruga and Nripa Kama I (976), and Munda (1006–1026). The next king,  Nripa Kama I, had the title Permanadi, showing that an early alliance with the Western Ganga dynasty existed at the time of his reign.

Vishnuvardhana's ambition of creating an independent empire was fulfilled by his grandson Veera Ballala II, who freed the Hoysalas from domination by the Chalukya Empire during the first 20 years of his reign. He declared war against the Yadavas and defeated the Kadambas. He declared independence in 1193. During the establishment of the Hoysala Empire, the Deccan Plateau saw a four-way struggle for hegemony between four dynasties: the Hoysalas, the Pandyans, the Kakatiyas, and the Seunas. In 1217, Veera Ballala II defeated the aggressive Pandya after they invaded the Chola kingdom, and helped to restore the Chola king.

Increased influence and later eclipse
The Hoysalas extended their foothold in modern-day Tamil Nadu around 1225, making the city of Kannanur Kuppam near Srirangam a provincial capital and taking control over the southern Deccan region. Vira Narasimha II's son Vira Someshwara earned the honorific "uncle" (Mamadi) from the Pandyas and Cholas. From 1220 to 1245 the dynasty's hegemony increased southwards to cover both the Chola and Pandya kingdoms. Toward the end of the 13th century, Veera Ballala III recaptured territory in the Tamil country which had been lost during a Pandya uprising, thus uniting the northern and southern portions of the kingdom.

In the early part of the 14th century, major political changes took place in the Deccan region  during a period when large areas of northern India were under Muslim rule. Alauddin Khalji, the Sultan of Delhi, was determined to control southern India. In 1311 he sent his commander Malik Kafur on an expedition to plunder Devagiri, the capital city of the Seuna kingdom By 1318 the Seuna kingdom had  been subjugated. The Hoysala capital Halebidu was besieged and sacked twice, in 1311 and 1327. By 1336, the Sultan had conquered the Pandyas of Madurai, the Kakatiyas of Warangal and the tiny kingdom of Kampili. The Hoysalas were the only remaining Hindu empire who resisted the invading armies. Veera Ballala III stationed himself at Tiruvannamalai and offered stiff resistance to invasions from the north and the Madurai Sultanate to the south. Then, after nearly three decades of resistance, Veera Ballala III was killed at the battle of Madurai in 1343, and the sovereign territories of the Hoysala empire were merged with the areas administered by Harihara I in the Tungabhadra River region. This new Hindu kingdom resisted the northern invasions and would later prosper and come to be known as the Vijayanagara Empire.

Economy

The empire consisted of the valleys of three main rivers, the Krishna, the Tungabhadra, and the Kaveri, whose systems facilitated the growth of crops and generated an agricultural output that was immense. The highlands (malnad regions) with its temperate climate was suitable for raising cattle and the planting of orchards and spices. Paddy and corn were staple crops in the tropical plains (Bailnad). As agricultural land was scarce, forests, waste land and previously unfarmed land was reclaimed, and new settlements were established. Large areas of forest were cleared to bring lands under cultivation and build villages. The Hoysala kings gave grants of land as rewards for service to the heads of families, who then became landlords (gavunda) to tenants who worked on the land and in the forests. The praja gavunda ("the gavunda of the people") had a lower status than the wealthier prabhu gavunda ("of the lord") 

The Hoysala administration supported itself through revenues from an agrarian economy. Land was assessed as being wet land, dry land or garden land for the purposes of taxation, and judged according to the quality of the soil. Taxes on commodities (gold, precious stones, perfumes, sandalwood, ropes, yarn, housing, hearths, shops, cattle pans, sugarcane presses) as well as produce (black pepper, betel leaves, ghee, paddy, spices, palm leaves, coconuts, sugar) are noted in village records. The Hoysalas encouraged people to move to newly-built villages by means of land grants and tax concessions.

Taxes, collected in the form of cash, from trade and commerce generated considerable wealth for the Hoysala state, and enabled it to buy armaments, elephants, horses and precious goods. The state and the merchant class became interdependent, with some more prosperous merchants being known as Rajasresthigal (royal merchants), officially recognised on account of their wealth. They were seen as puramulasthamba (‘the pillars of the towns’). The increased prosperity and prestige of some merchants encouraged them to open markets and weekly fairs, with some becoming Pattanaswami (town administrators), who had the authority to collect tolls on goods that entered the town.  Merchants engaged in minting activities, sometimes producing the coins and supplying them to the state.

Tanks (large reservoirs) were created at the expense of the state. The Hoysalas put resources into repairing breached tanks and broken sluices, easily damaged by heavy rainfall. They collected taxes on irrigation systems, canals and wells, all of which were built and maintained at the expense of local villagers. Repairs were undertaken by the landlords as well as their workers; such repairs were considered to be a duty and a pious act.

Importing horses for use as general transportation and in army cavalries of Indian kingdoms was a flourishing business on the western seaboard. Song dynasty records from China mention the presence of Indian merchants in ports of South China, indicating active trade with overseas kingdoms. South India exported textiles, spices, medicinal plants, precious stones, pottery, salt made from salt pans, jewels, gold, ivory, rhino horn, ebony, aloe wood, perfumes, sandalwood, camphor and condiments to China, Dhofar, Aden, and Siraf (the entryport to Egypt, Arabia and Persia).

Administration

In its administrative practices, the Hoysala Empire followed some of the well-established and proven methods of its predecessors covering administrative functions such as cabinet organisation and command, the structure of local governing bodies and the division of territory. Several of their major feudatories were Gavundas of the peasant extraction. Records show the names of many high-ranking positions reporting directly to the king. Senior ministers were called Pancha Pradhanas, ministers responsible for foreign affairs were designated Sandhivigrahi and the chief treasurer was Mahabhandari or Hiranyabhandari. Dandanayakas were in charge of armies and the chief justice of the Hoysala court was the Dharmadhikari.

The kingdom was divided into provinces named Nadu, Vishaya, Kampana and Desha, listed in descending order of geographical size. Each province had a local governing body consisting of a minister (Mahapradhana) and a treasurer (Bhandari) that reported to the ruler of that province (Dandanayaka). Under this local ruler were officials called Heggaddes and Gavundas who hired and supervised the local farmers and labourers recruited to till the land. Subordinate ruling clans such as Alupas continued to govern their respective territories while following the policies set by the empire.

An elite and well-trained force of bodyguards known as Garudas protected the members of the royal family at all times. These servants moved closely yet inconspicuously by the side of their master, their loyalty being so complete that they committed suicide after his death. Hero stones (virgal) erected in memory of these bodyguards are called Garuda pillars. The Garuda pillar at the Hoysaleswara temple in Halebidu was erected in honor of Kuvara Lakshma, a minister and bodyguard of King Veera Ballala II.

King Vishnuvardhana's coins had the legends "victor at Nolambavadi" (Nolambavadigonda), "victor at Talakad" (Talakadugonda), "chief of the Malepas"  (Maleparolganda), "Brave of Malepa" (malapavira) in Hoysala style Kannada script. Their gold coin was called Honnu or Gadyana and weighed 62 grains of gold. Pana or Hana was a tenth of the Honnu, Haga was a fourth of the Pana and Visa was fourth of Haga. There were other coins called Bele and Kani.

Culture

Religion

The defeat of the Jain Western Gangas by the Cholas in the early 11th century and the rising numbers of followers of Vaishnavism and Lingayatism in the 12th century was mirrored by a decreased interest in Jainism. Two notable locations of Jain worship in the Hoysala territory were Shravanabelagola and Panchakuta Basadi, Kambadahalli. The decline of Buddhism in South India began in the eighth century with the spread of Adi Shankara's Advaita Vedanta. The only places of Buddhist worship during the Hoysala time were at Dambal and Balligavi. Shantala Devi, queen of Vishnuvardhana, was a Jain but nevertheless commissioned the Hindu Kappe Chennigaraya temple in Belur, evidence that the royal family was tolerant of all religions.

During the rule of the Hoysalas, three important religious developments took place in present-day Karnataka inspired by three philosophers, Basava, Madhvacharya and Ramanuja.

While the origin of Lingayatism is debated, the movement grew through its association with Basava in the 12th century. Madhvacharya was critical of the teachings of Adi Shankara and argued the world is real and not an illusion. His Dvaita Vedanta gained popularity, enabling him to establish eight mathas in Udupi. Ramanuja, head of the Vaishnava monastery in Srirangam, preached the way of devotion (bhakti marga) and wrote Sribhashya, a critique on Adi Shankara's Advaita.

The effect of these religious developments on culture, literature, poetry and architecture in South India was profound. Important works of literature and poetry based on the teachings of these philosophers were written during the coming centuries. The Saluva, Tuluva and Aravidu dynasties of the Vijayanagara Empire were followers of Vaishnavism and a Vaishnava temple with an image of Ramanuja exists in the Vitthalapura area of Vijayanagara. Scholars in the later Kingdom of Mysore wrote Vaishnavite works upholding the teachings of Ramanuja. King Vishnuvardhana built many temples after his conversion from Jainism to Vaishnavism. The later saints of Madhvacharya's order, Jayatirtha, Vyasatirtha, Sripadaraja, Vadiraja Tirtha and devotees (dasa) such as Vijaya Dasa, Gopaladasa and others from the Karnataka region spread his teachings far and wide. His teachings inspired later philosophers like Vallabha in Gujarat and Chaitanya Mahaprabhu in Bengal. Another wave of devotion (bhakti) in the 17th and 18th centuries found inspiration in his teachings.

Society

Hoysala society in many ways reflected the emerging religious, political and cultural developments of those times. During this period, the society became increasingly sophisticated. The status of women was varied. Some royal women were involved in administrative matters as shown in contemporary records describing Queen Umadevi's administration of Halebidu in the absence of Veera Ballala II during his long military campaigns in northern territories. She also fought and defeated some antagonistic feudal rebels. Records describe the participation of women in the fine arts, such as Queen Shantala Devi's skill in dance and music, and the 12th-century vachana sahitya poet and Lingayati mystic Akka Mahadevi's devotion to the bhakti  movement is well known. Temple dancers (Devadasi) were common and some were well educated and accomplished in the arts. These qualifications gave them more freedom than other urban and rural women who were restricted to daily mundane tasks. The practice of sati in a voluntary form was prevalent and prostitution was socially acceptable. As in most of India, a caste system was conspicuously present.

Trade on the west coast brought many foreigners to India including Arabs, Jews, Persians, Europeans, Chinese and people from the Malay Peninsula. Migration of people within Southern India as a result of the expansion of the empire produced an influx of new cultures and skills. In South India, towns were called Pattana or Pattanam and the marketplace, Nagara or Nagaram, the marketplace serving as the nuclei of a city. Some towns such as Shravanabelagola developed from a religious settlement in the 7th century to an important trading centre by the 12th century with the arrival of rich traders, while towns like Belur attained the atmosphere of a regal city when King Vishnuvardhana built the Chennakesava Temple there. Large temples supported by royal patronage served religious, social, and judiciary purposes, elevating the king to the level of "God on earth".

Temple building served a commercial as well as a religious function and was not limited to any particular sect of Hinduism. Shaiva merchants of Halebidu financed the construction of the Hoysaleswara temple to compete with the Chennakesava temple built at Belur, elevating Halebidu to an important city as well. Hoysala temples however were secular and encouraged pilgrims of all Hindu sects, the Kesava temple at Somanathapura being an exception with strictly Vaishnava sculptural depictions. Temples built by rich landlords in rural areas fulfilled fiscal, political, cultural and religious needs of the agrarian communities. Irrespective of patronage, large temples served as establishments that provided employment to hundreds of people of various guilds and professions sustaining local communities as Hindu temples began to take on the shape of wealthy Buddhist monasteries.

Literature

Although Sanskrit literature remained popular during the Hoysala rule, royal patronage of local Kannada scholars increased. In the 12th century some works were written in the Champu style, but distinctive Kannada metres became more widely accepted. The Sangatya metre used in compositions, Shatpadi (six line), tripadi (three line) metres in verses and ragale (lyrical poems) became fashionable. Jain works continued to extol the virtues of Tirthankaras (Jain saviour figures).

The Hoysala court supported scholars such as Janna, Rudrabhatta, Harihara and his nephew Raghavanka, whose works are enduring masterpieces in Kannada. In 1209, the Jain scholar Janna wrote Yashodharacharite, the story of a king who intends to perform a ritual sacrifice of two young boys to a local deity, Mariamma. Taking pity on the boys, the king releases them and gives up the practice of human sacrifice. In honour of this work, Janna received the title "Emperor among poets" (Kavichakravarthi) from King Veera Ballala II.

Rudrabhatta, a Smarta Brahmin, was the earliest well-known Brahminical writer. HIs patron was Chandramouli, a minister of King Veera Ballala II. Based on the earlier work Vishnu Purana, he wrote Jagannatha Vijaya in the Champu style relating the life of Krishna leading up to his fight with the demon Banasura.

Harihara, (also known as Harisvara) a Lingayati writer and the patron of King Narasimha I, wrote the Girijakalyana in the old Jain Champu style which describes the marriage of Shiva and Parvati in ten sections. He was one of the earliest Virashaiva writers who was not part of the vachana literary tradition. He came from a family of accountants (Karanikas) from Halebidu and spent many years in Hampi writing more than one hundred ragales (poems in blank verse) in praise of Virupaksha (a form of Shiva). Raghavanka was the first to introduce the Shatpadi metre into Kannada literature in his Harishchandra kavya which is considered a classic even though it occasionally violates strict rules of Kannada grammar.

In Sanskrit, Madhvacharya wrote the Rigbhshya on the Brahma Sutras (a logical explanation of Hindu scriptures, the Vedas) as well as many polemical works rebutting the doctrines of other schools. He relied more on the Puranas than the Vedas for logical proof of his philosophy. Another famous writing was Rudraprshnabhashya by Vidyatirtha.

Architecture

The modern interest in the Hoysalas is due to their patronage of art and architecture rather than their military conquests. The brisk temple building throughout the kingdom was accomplished despite constant threats from the Pandyas to the south and the Seunas Yadavas to the north. Their architectural style, an offshoot of the Western Chalukya style, shows distinct Dravidian influences. The Hoysala architecture style is described as Karnata Dravida as distinguished from the traditional Dravida, and is considered an independent architectural tradition with many unique features.

A feature of Hoysala temple architecture is its attention to exquisite detail and skilled craftsmanship. The tower over the temple shrine (vimana) is delicately finished with intricate carvings, showing attention to the ornate and elaborately detailed rather than to a tower form and height. The stellate design of the base of the shrine with its rhythmic projections and recesses is carried through the tower in an orderly succession of decorated tiers. Hoysala temple sculpture replicates this emphasis on delicacy and craftsmanship in its focus on depicting feminine beauty, grace and physique. The Hoysala artists achieved this with the use of Soapstone (Chloritic schist), a soft stone as basic building and sculptural material.

The Chennakesava Temple at Belur (1117), the Hoysaleswara Temple at Halebidu (1121), the Chennakesava Temple at Somanathapura (1279), the temples at Arasikere (1220), Amruthapura (1196), Belavadi (1200), Nuggehalli (1246), Hosaholalu (1250), Aralaguppe (1250), Korvangla (1173), Haranhalli (1235), Mosale and Basaralu (1234) are some of the notable examples of Hoysala art. While the temples at Belur and Halebidu are the best known because of the beauty of their sculptures, the Hoysala art finds more complete expression in the smaller and lesser known temples. The outer walls of all these temples contain an intricate array of stone sculptures and horizontal friezes (decorative mouldings) that depict the Hindu epics. These depictions are generally clockwise in the traditional direction of circumambulation (pradakshina). The temple of Halebidu has been described as an outstanding example of Hindu architecture and an important milestone in Indian architecture. The temples of Belur and Halebidu are a proposed UNESCO world heritage sites.

Language
The support of the Hoysala rulers for the Kannada language was strong, and this is seen even in their epigraphs, often written in polished and poetic language, rather than prose, with illustrations of floral designs in the margins. According to historian Sheldon Pollock, the Hoysala era saw the complete displacement of Sanskrit, with Kannada dominating as the courtly language.

Temples served as local schools where learned Brahmins taught in Sanskrit, while Jain and Buddhist monasteries educated novice monks. Schools of higher learning were called Ghatikas. The local Kannada language was widely used in the rising number of devotional movements to express the ecstatic experience of closeness to the deity (vachanas and devaranama). Literary works were written in it on palm leaves which were tied together. While in past centuries Jain works had dominated Kannada literature, Shaiva and early Brahminical works became popular during the Hoysala reign.

Writings in Sanskrit included poetry, grammar, lexicon, manuals, rhetoric, commentaries on older works, prose fiction and drama. Inscriptions on stone (Shilashasana) and copper plates (Tamarashasana) were written mostly in Kannada but some were in Sanskrit or were bilingual. The sections of bilingual inscriptions stating the title, genealogy, origin myths of the king and benedictions were generally done in Sanskrit. Kannada was used to state terms of the grants, including information on the land, its boundaries, the participation of local authorities, rights and obligations of the grantee, taxes and dues, and witnesses. This ensured the content was clearly understood by the local people without ambiguity.

Notes

References

Bibliography

Web

Further reading

External links

 
1343 disestablishments in Asia
States and territories established in 1026
Empires and kingdoms of India
Former countries in South Asia
Historical Hindu empires
Jain empires and kingdoms
Hindu monarchs
States and territories disestablished in 1343